Otter Creek is a  creek in Davidson County, Tennessee. It is the effluent of Radnor Lake, and flows through Radnor Lake State Natural Area. It is a tributary of the Little Harpeth River, and via the Little Harpeth, Harpeth, Cumberland, and Ohio rivers, it is part of the Mississippi River watershed.

The creek gets its name because it once contained river otters.

See also
List of rivers of Tennessee

References

Rivers of Davidson County, Tennessee
Rivers of Tennessee